József Dzurják (born 2 March 1962) is a Hungarian football manager and former player.

Playing career
His youth career was at Ikladi Vasas, Jászberényi Lehel, Jászárokszállási Vasas, Békéscsaba, and L. Szabó Hónved SE.

He made his debut in the Nemzeti Bajnokság I in the season 1983–84 playing with Diósgyőri VTK. That season his team ended up relegated and played in Nemzeti Bajnokság II with Dzurják being the league top-scorer two seasons in a raw. In 1986, he moved to Hungarian giants Ferencváros where he played till 1990. He finished his last season with Fradi as league top scorer. This meant that for Dzurják was time to move abroad, signing with the East German 1990 vice-champions Chemnitzer FC, being one of the few foreigners to play in the last season of the DDR-Oberliga.  After six months during the winter break, he moved to FK Spartak Subotica where he spend the rest of the season playing in the Yugoslav First League. After this, he returned and played half season with Ferencvaros, before moving again, this time to Cyprus, to play with AC Omonia one and a half seasons. He will return to Hungary and play with III. Kerületi TUE, Vác FC and Diósgyőri VTK before moving to the Maldives in 1996 where he ended his career.  He played as a striker.

International career
On 13 May 1987, Dzurják received a call on behalf of coach József Verebes to be part of the Hungary Olympic team and played in a game against Spain scoring a goal in the game. He then also played against Sweden on 9 September, same year.

Coaching career
After retiring, he initially became a sports journalist at Nemzeti Sportnál. Then he started his coaching career, first coaching the youth teams of Dunakeszi, BVSC, REAC and the U-17 and U-19 teams of Ferencvaros. Then he worked as assistant manager, initially in Hungary at Diósgyőri VTK, Videoton and Zalaegerzeg, and then abroad in Albania, Malaysia and the Maldives, where he won the championship.

In March 208 he was appointed the main coach of Club Valencia competing in the Dhivehi League, the top league in the Maldives. Since 2012 he has been assistant manager at Diósgyőri VTK.

Honours

As player
Diósgyőri VTK
Nemzeti Bajnokság II top scorer: 1984–85, 1985–86

Ferencvaros
Nemzeti Bajnokság I top scorer: 1989–90
Magyar Kupa: 1991

Omonia Nicosia
 Cypriot First Division: 1992–93
 Cypriot First Division top-scorer: 1991–92 (21 goals)

As manager
Club Valencia
 Dhivehi League: 2008
 Maldives National Championship: 2008

References

External links
 Hungarian Championship stats at nela.hu

Living people
1961 births
Hungarian footballers
Hungarian expatriate footballers
Diósgyőri VTK players
Ferencvárosi TC footballers
FK Spartak Subotica players
Yugoslav First League players
Cypriot First Division players
DDR-Oberliga players
Expatriate footballers in Yugoslavia
Chemnitzer FC players
Expatriate footballers in East Germany
Expatriate footballers in Germany
AC Omonia players
Expatriate footballers in Cyprus
Vác FC players
Association football forwards
Hungarian football managers
Hungarian expatriate sportspeople in Serbia and Montenegro
Hungarian expatriate sportspeople in East Germany
People from Gödöllő
Sportspeople from Pest County